Bloomsbury is an unincorporated community in central Alberta in the County of Barrhead No. 11, located  north of Highway 33, approximately  northwest of Edmonton.

Localities in the County of Barrhead No. 11